Nemanja Jaramaz (born July 10, 1991) is a Serbian professional basketball player for KK Dynamic Belgrade of the Basketball League of Serbia.

Professional career
In 2006, Jaramaz joined the KK Partizan junior team. He was loaned to Mega Vizura for the 2009–10 season. In 2010 he returned to Partizan and begin to play for the senior team. In March 2012, he was loaned again to Mega Vizura for the remainder of the season.

In June 2012, Jaramaz signed a one-year deal with the Italian team Angelico Biella. In January 2013, he was released by the Biella. Later that month he moved to Kazakhstan and signed with BC Astana for the remainder of the season.

In July 2013, Jaramaz signed a one-year deal with the Polish team Turów Zgorzelec. With them he won the Polish League in the 2013–14 season. In July 2014, he re-signed with Turow for one more season.

On September 14, 2015, Jaramaz signed with Budućnost Podgorica. In April 2016, he left Budućnost and signed with the Spanish club ICL Manresa for the rest of the 2015–16 ACB season.

On November 3, 2016, Jaramaz signed with Polish club Anwil Włocławek for the rest of the 2016–17 PLK season.

On September 19, 2017, Jaramaz signed a two-month contract with German club Oettinger Rockets. Following the expiration of his contract, he parted ways with Oettinger on November 28, 2017. Two days later, he signed with Basketball Löwen Braunschweig for the rest of the 2017–18 BBL season.

On July 22, 2020, Jaramaz signed a two-year contract with FMP. He parted ways with FMP in October 2020, after playing only one ABA game. In December 2020, he signed for Hungarian team KTE-Duna Aszfalt.

Career statistics

EuroLeague

|-
| style="text-align:left;"| 2010–11
| style="text-align:left;"| Partizan
| 2 || 0 || 1.1 || .000 || .000 || .000 || .0 || .0 || .0 || .0 || .0 || .0
|-
| style="text-align:left;"| 2011–12
| style="text-align:left;"| Partizan
| 5 || 0 || 3.0 || .000 || .000 || .000 || .2 || .0 || .2 || .0 || .0 || -.8
|-
| style="text-align:left;"| 2014–15
| style="text-align:left;"| Turów
| 10 || 3 || 24.4 || .389 || .382 || .867 || 2.9 || 2.9 || .3 || .1 || 9.5 || 11.5
|- class="sortbottom"
| style="text-align:center;" colspan=2 | Career
| 18 || 3 || 14.5 || .384 || .371 || .867 || 1.7 || 1.6 || .2 || .1 || 5.3 || 6.2

National team career
Jaramaz was a member of the Serbia U16 national team which won a gold medal at the 2007 FIBA Europe Under-16 Championship.

Personal life
His younger brother is Ognjen, also a professional basketball player.

References

External links

 Nemanja Jaramaz at aba-liga.com
 Nemanja Jaramaz at acb.com
 Nemanja Jaramaz at fiba.com
 Nemanja Jaramaz at eurobasket.com
 Nemanja Jaramaz at euroleague.net

1991 births
Living people
ABA League players
Basketball League of Serbia players
Basketball Löwen Braunschweig players
Bàsquet Manresa players
BC Astana players
KK Budućnost players
KK FMP players
KK Mega Basket players
KK Partizan players
KK Włocławek players
Kecskeméti TE (basketball) players
Liga ACB players
Pallacanestro Biella players
Sportspeople from Nikšić
Serbs of Montenegro
Serbian men's basketball players
Serbian expatriate basketball people in Germany
Serbian expatriate basketball people in Italy
Serbian expatriate basketball people in Hungary
Serbian expatriate basketball people in Poland
Serbian expatriate basketball people in Spain
Shooting guards
Stal Ostrów Wielkopolski players
Rockets (basketball club) players
Turów Zgorzelec players